Rajendranath College of Polytechnic is a public diploma engineering institution established by the Rajendranath Education & Welfare Trust in 2012. It is approved by AICTE, New Delhi.

References

Engineering colleges in West Bengal
Educational institutions established in 2012
2012 establishments in West Bengal